Gateway Academy is a private school in Scottsdale, Arizona. It specializes in the education of students with autism spectrum disorders and other pervasive developmental disorders.

Background
Gateway Academy was established in 2005 and offers a private education for students from 6th through 12th grade with a diagnosis on the Autism spectrum. The average ratio of students to teachers is 5:1, which it claims results in individualized attention for every student.
The general curriculum includes English, Math, History, Science, Physical Education (Get Fit), and World Language Lab, with Occupational Therapy, Speech Therapy and Music Therapy sessions once each week. Gateway Academy's first graduating class was back in 2008, with one student.

About
Gateway Academy provides for students from age five to nineteen years of age with autism spectrum disorders, PDD not otherwise specified, social/behavioral issues, emotional and social difficulties and specific learning difficulties associated with spectrum disorders.

Education
Gateway Academy provides a specialized education for children 5 to 19 with autism spectrum disorders, PDD-nos, and associated disorders.

The school operates a year-round program from June–May of each year and can provide placements for up to 32 students.

Many students with autism spectrum disorders are academically very able. Every student has an individual program structured through their individual education plan (IEP), which is determined upon completing yearly assessments. This is monitored and reviewed quarterly to ensure that attainable goals are being set and measured; strengths are played to; and full potential is being met.

Classes are grouped according to chronological age and ability with a maximum of ten students per class. Individualized teaching is necessary for some students in certain subjects and additional support is provided where required.

Gateway Academy employs all learning modalities such as visual, auditory, kinesthetic and experiential situations as learning opportunities.

Education is continued beyond the normal school day with additional after school sessions in independent living skills, equine therapy, yoga, Deeksha, therapeutic groups,  music, and indoor/outdoor activities.

References
 School Website
 Social Media Club Youtube Channel

2005 establishments in Arizona
Autism-related organizations in the United States
Educational institutions established in 2005
Learning disabilities
Mental health organizations in Arizona
Private high schools in Arizona
Private middle schools in Arizona
Private elementary schools in Arizona
Schools for people on the autistic spectrum
Special schools in the United States